Jhok Siyal is a Pakistani television series first broadcast on Pakistan Television Corporation. It was based on a novel by Shabbir Shah with screenplay was written by Munnu Bhai, and directed by Yawar Hayat Khan. The series was the on-screen debut of Abid Ali, who played the leading role in the series. Set in rural Punjab, the series revolves around feudalism. It aired in 1973.

The series is considered as a revolutionary classic, due to its scale and the themes it touched uopn, such as exploitation of poor and rich, poverty and economic inequality.

Cast 
 Bindiya
 Badi Uzzaman
 Abid Ali
 Humaira Ali
 Salim Nasir

References 

1970s Pakistani television series
Pakistani drama television series
Pakistan Television Corporation original programming
Pakistani television dramas based on novels
Urdu-language television shows